Yvette Amice (June 4, 1936 – July 4, 1993) was a French mathematician whose research concerned number theory and -adic analysis. She was president of the Société mathématique de France.

Education
Amice studied mathematics at the École normale supérieure de jeunes filles in Sèvres, beginnining in 1956 and earning her agrégation in 1959. She became an assistant at the Faculté des sciences de Paris until 1964, when she completed a state doctorate under the supervision of Charles Pisot. Her dissertation was Interpolation p-adique [p-adic interpolation].

Career
On completing her doctorate, she became maître de conférences at the University of Poitiers and then, in 1966, professor at the University of Bordeaux. She returned to Poitiers in 1968 but then in 1970 became one of the founding professors of Paris Diderot University, where she was vice president from 1978 to 1981.

In 1975 she became president of the Société mathématique de France.

Textbook
Amice was the author of a textbook on the p-adic number system, Les nombres p-adiques (Presses Universitaires de France, 1975).

References

1936 births
1993 deaths
20th-century French mathematicians
French women mathematicians
20th-century French women
Academic staff of the University of Bordeaux
Academic staff of Paris Diderot University